Ewart Potgieter (born ) is a South African rugby union player for the  in the Currie Cup. His regular position is flanker.

Potgieter was named in the  squad for the Super Rugby Unlocked and 2020 Currie Cup Premier Division competitions.

References

South African rugby union players
Living people
1998 births
Rugby union flankers
Pumas (Currie Cup) players
Blue Bulls players